Barroetea is a genus of flowering plants in the family Asteraceae.

 Species
All the species are endemic to Mexico.
 Barroetea brevipes B.L.Rob. - Oaxaca
 Barroetea laxiflora Brandegee - Puebla
 Barroetea pavonii A.Gray - Michoacán, Mexico State, Guerrero, Oaxaca, Puebla
 Barroetea sessilifolia Greenm.	 - Morelos 
 Barroetea setosa A.Gray - San Luis Potosí
 Barroetea subuligera A.Gray  - from Chihuahua + Tamaulipas to Guerrero

References

Asteraceae genera
Eupatorieae
Endemic flora of Mexico